The Chemins de fer de Paris à Orléans et du Midi, often abbreviated to PO-Midi, was an early French railway company. It was formed in 1934 following the merging of the Chemin de fer de Paris à Orléans and the Chemins de fer du Midi.

In 1937 it was nationalised to become part of the Société Nationale des Chemins de fer Français (SNCF).

Railway companies of France
French companies established in 1934
1937 disestablishments in France
Railway companies established in 1934
Railway companies disestablished in 1937